New England District may refer to:

New England District of the Lutheran Church–Missouri Synod, U.S.
Electoral district of New England, New South Wales, Australia

See also
New England (disambiguation)